Reyes Tamez Guerra (born 18 April 1952 in Monterrey) is a Mexican immunochemist and politicians. He is a former Secretary of Education for the State of Nuevo León, a former president of the Autonomous University of Nuevo León (UANL) and a former Secretary of Education in the cabinet of Vicente Fox (2000–2006).

Biography

Tamez Guerra graduated from the Autonomous University of Nuevo León in 1975 with a bachelor's degree in Chemistry, Biology and Parasitology and received both a master's degree and a doctorate's degree in immunology at the National Polytechnic Institute (IPN). Later on he did a postdoctoral stay at the Institute of Cancerology and Imnunogenetics at Villejuif, France.

From 1996 to 2000 Tamez served as rector of the Autonomous University of Nuevo León (UANL) then from 2000 to 2006 he served as Secretary of Education in the cabinet of Vicente Fox. In January 2007 the Governor of Nuevo León Natividad González Parás designated him as the Nuevo León Secretary of Education replacing former incumbent Yolanda Blanco.

In 2009 he was elected via proportional representation as a New Alliance deputy in the LXI Legislature of the Mexican Congress.

Tamez co-authored two books in this area of expertise, has presented over 120 papers at national and international conferences and has published over 30 articles in several national and international journals. He has received the Jorge Rosenkranz National Prize in Medical Research and is a member of the Mexican Academy of Sciences.

References

External links
OECD: Reyes Tamez

1952 births
Living people
Mexican biochemists
Mexican immunologists
Politicians from Monterrey
Autonomous University of Nuevo León alumni
Instituto Politécnico Nacional alumni
Academic staff of the Autonomous University of Nuevo León
Mexican Secretaries of Education
New Alliance Party (Mexico) politicians
Members of the Chamber of Deputies (Mexico)
Members of the Mexican Academy of Sciences
21st-century Mexican politicians
21st-century Mexican scientists
20th-century Mexican scientists
Heads of universities and colleges in Mexico
Deputies of the LXI Legislature of Mexico